Amongst The Pigeons is an English record producer of electro–dance music based in Brighton, England.

As well as releasing his own original music he has also remixed tracks for other artists.

Some of the artists he has worked with on original collaborations include Frank Turner, Beans On Toast,  Chris T-T, Piers Blewitt, Oliver Barron and Sean Cooter.

There has also been a number of Amongst The Pigeons remixes made for artists such as The Agitator, Justice Force 5, Anna Madeline and Fast Trains.

Recorded Music
The first ATP release was a limited-edition 4 track EP called Wings Wings: Beat (2004).

The debut album Music to brush your teeth to was released in 2009 and contained 16 tracks. Two follow up EPs were released in 2010:

Repeat to Fade gained coverage in on-line music press. Another EP called Flat On Me Back was also released in the summer of 2010 which was made whilst recovering from a major back operation.

Amongst The Pigeons recorded the second album throughout 2011 with the working title of ATPLP2. Get Amongst It was eventually released in April 2012. The album received positive reviews.

At the start of 2013 a 4 track EP called "Ornithophobia" was released. In July 2013 a single called "Boing" was released. In the Autumn of 2013 a single featuring Ben Marwood was released. In 2014 an EP called 'Cocktail Party Syndrome' was released.

In November 2019, Amongst The Pigeons released their third album, Those Stolen Moments, which was the first new music in over five years.

Live
In 2010, Amongst The Pigeons started playing live and was invited to play The Great Escape stage at the annual Brighton Live festival. Since then Amongst The Pigeons has played at a number of UK festivals including: The Glastonbury Festival, The Great Escape, Secret Garden Party, Blissfields, Frolic and Southsea Fest. In 2019, they started playing again with a set at Glastonbury Festival and supported the USA band Moon Hooch during the summer.

Discography

Demos
ATP:Demo#1 2004

Singles and EPs 
"Wings Wings: Beat" EP, Marowak Records Ltd, 2005
"Deep Housey" single, Marowak Records Ltd, 2009
"Larkin About" single, Marowak Records Ltd, 2009
"Repeat To Fade" EP, Marowak Records Ltd, 2010
"Flat On Me Back" EP, Marowak Records Ltd, 2010
"The Inherent Racism of Doves" / "The Return of The Red-Eyed Raver" single, Marowak Records Ltd, 2012
"Jaffa Clown Dog" single, Marowak Records Ltd, 2012
"Empties" single Marowak Records Ltd, 2012
"Ornithophobia" EP  Marowak Records Ltd, 2013
"Boing" single  Marowak Records Ltd, 2013
"Then the Bell Rings" single  Marowak Records Ltd, 2013
"Cocktail Party Syndrome" EP  Marowak Records Ltd, 2014
"Close My Eyes" EP  Marowak Records Ltd, 2014

Albums
Music to Brush Your Teeth To, Marowak Records Ltd, 2009
Get Amongst It, Marowak Records Ltd, 2012
Those Stolen Moments, Peace and Feathers, 2019

References

Musicians from Brighton and Hove
English electronic musicians
Living people
Year of birth missing (living people)